= William Winsborough =

American computer scientist

William H. Winsborough was an American computer scientist, having taught at University of Texas at San Antonio and an Elected Fellow of the American Association for the Advancement of Science.
